Estudiantes de Mérida Fútbol Club (usually called Estudiantes de Mérida, or simply Estudiantes) is a professional football club of the Venezuelan league, based in Mérida, Venezuela. It has performed well in both national and international competitions, like Copa Libertadores, and has won titles in several regional and national competitions.

History

Everything start when Mérida conquest both Junior Championships made in this city during the years of 1969 and 1970. This caught the fever to aspire to have a professional football team in the tourist city Venezuela quintessential student. The deceased Don José Arano (Basque birth) and Luis Ghersi Govea, performed the first legal contacts with Major League Soccer and the Venezuelan Football Federation (FVF). Once the appropriate steps in the city of Caracas, contact Guillermo Soto Rosa, who in turn communicates with other friends, also engineers, Ramon Chiarelli and Gabriel Angarita, who show interest in the nascent idea and spread of the emotive idea in Mérida: Luis Jimenez Ron, Amadis Canizales, Daniel D 'Jesus Trejo, Eli Joseph Camacho and Fausto Ghiraldini, among others.

By then, join institutional and public efforts, the then president of the University of Los Andes, Pedro Rincón Gutiérrez and Dr. Briceno Ferrigni, then Governor of the state of Mérida, who together perform all the steps of rigor to the entities coordinating professional soccer in Venezuela. At the same time, running the works related to the improvement and expansion of the football stadium facilities most of Mérida, Guillermo Soto Rosa Stadium, located in a popular area of the city between the Santa Juana, Pie del Llano, santa Monica, Cuatricentenario and Campo de Oro. The first team's headquarters, is a modest apartment, where on April 4, 1971, meet 58 people in order to form the first Board by then stay composed by Luis A. Ron Jimenez, Amadis Canizales, Jorge Pereyra, Don José Arano, Uzcátegui Spirit, Carmelo Colella and Elio Scanu.

Membership with Antonio J. La Hoz as coach. the uniform would be a striped shirt red and white, blue pants, white socks with horizontal stripes, design inspired by the colors of the Colegio San José de Mérida, as the majority of the promoters of the team had former students of that campus. Was defined as a second uniform shirt with green and white stripes, white shorts and white socks.

The name of the institution is as Football Club Estudiantes de Mérida and the day May 17, 1971, the official request is made to the Major League Soccer for the registration of the Club. The official team presentation is made on September 4, 1971, at a popular hotel in the city. Until the 12th of October of the same year at 11:00 am, appears in the programmed Guillermo Soto Rosa Stadium, the red-white currency captained by number 10 Luis Mendoza. Students counted as a godfather for release sports, Deportivo Portugues from the capital of the country, who fell 2 goals to 1, with goals scored by Uruguayan Chiazzaro José and Brazilian César Márquez.

For 1999 occupies the 5th place as the best team in South America and ranked 43 in the world. He has won two league titles (1980 and 1985), two Copa Venezuela (1971 and 1975), has been sub-national champion five times and has participated in several Copa Libertadores and Copa Conmebol, Copa Merconorte.

Later, on May 14, 2006 the team, after losing 4-2 against Deportivo Italmaracaibo, went to Second Division, after 35 years of being in the First Division. His return to the first division occurs in the month of May 2007, thanks to the expansion of First Division clubs 10-18.

Titles
Primera División Venezolana: 2
Amateur Era (0):
Professional Era (2): 1980, 1985

Segunda División Venezolana: 0
Segunda División B Venezolana: 0
Tercera División Venezolana: 0
Copa de Venezuela: 2

1971, 1975

Performance in CONMEBOL competitions
Copa Libertadores: 7 appearances
1977: First Round
1978: First Round
1981: First Round
1982: First Round
1987: First Round
1999: Quarter-Finals
2003: Preliminary Round

Copa Sudamericana: 1 appearance
2018: First stage

Recopa Sudamericana: 0 appearances
 :

Copa CONMEBOL: 1 appearance
1999: Quarter-Finals

Copa Merconorte: 1 appearance
2000: First Round

Colors

The club's colors are red, white and blue.

Stadium

The club plays their home matches at Estadio Metropolitano de Mérida, which seats 42,200 people and was inaugurated on December 7, 2005. The club previously played their home matches at Estadio Guillermo Soto Rosa, which seats 14,000 and was inaugurated on September 5, 1969.

Current first team players

Presidents

 Luis Alberto Jiménez Ron (1971–74)
 Manuel Padilla Hurtado (1974–79)
 Ramón Chiarelli Gómez (1980–81)
 Amadís Cañizales Patiño (1982–83)
 Manuel Padilla Hurtado (1983–85)
 Humberto Zambrano Román (1985–87)
 Guillermo Soto Rosa (1988–89)
 Luis Hugo Velásquez (1989–91)
 Yolanda Briceño de García (1991–94)
 Alfredo Febres Córdero (1994–96)

 Álvaro Calderón Rivas (1996–97)
 César Guillén Lamus (1997–00)
 Alcides Monsalve Cedillo (2000–03)
 Juan Carlos Lobo Serrano (2004–05)
 Jorge Segundo Cegarra (2005–07)
 Héctor Albarrán (2008–09)
 Alcides Monsalve Cedillo (2010–11)
 César Guillén Lamus (2011–13)
 Frank Castillo Salazar (2013–)

Managers
 Rafael Dudamel (Oct 15, 2010–Dec 15, 2013)
 Manuel Plascencia (July 16, 2013–Jan 28, 2014)
 Francisco "El Pacho" Moreno (201?–)

References

Much of the content of this article comes from the equivalent Spanish-language Wikipedia article and from the equivalent French-language Wikipedia article (retrieved January 16, 2006).

External links

Official website

Association football clubs established in 1971
Football clubs in Venezuela
 
Mérida (state)
1971 establishments in Venezuela